Muzeum Czynu Niepodległościowego is a museum in Kraków, Poland. It was established in 1922.

Museums in Kraków
Museums established in 1922
1922 establishments in Poland
History museums in Poland